Siechnice  (formerly , renamed Kraftborn in the Nazi era) is a town in Wrocław County, Lower Silesian Voivodeship, in south-western Poland. It gained town status in 1997, and as of 2019 has a population of 8,113. Siechnice is part of the Wrocław metropolitan area.
 
Previously the district was called Gmina Święta Katarzyna, and Siechnice was the only town in Poland which neither gave its name to the gmina in which it lay nor served as its administrative seat.

In Siechnice there is a coal power plant called "Czechnica". It is a part of power planting system which supplies Wrocław.

History
The settlement was mentioned in 1253 under the Latinized name Sechenice. Between 1323 and 1810 the village was owned by the Knights of the Cross with the Red Star, whose symbol is depicted in the town's coat of arms. The village was devastated during the Thirty Years' War and the Seven Years' War. In 1909, it gained a railway connection with the Silesian capitals Wrocław and Opole. Siechnice was granted town rights on January 1, 1997.

Transport
The town has a railway station which connects Siechnice with Wrocław and Jelcz-Laskowice.

Gallery

References

Cities and towns in Lower Silesian Voivodeship
Wrocław County